Self Reliance is a 2023 film written, directed and starring Jake Johnson in his feature length directorial debut. The film also stars Anna Kendrick and Andy Samberg.

Cast
 Jake Johnson as Tommy
 Anna Kendrick as Maddy
 Andy Samberg 
 Christopher Lloyd
 Mary Holland
 Natalie Morales
 Emily Hampshire as Mary

Synopsis
Tommy (Johnson) receives an invitation to win a million dollars - by playing a game in which he must outwit hunters attempting to kill him. Tommy realises there’s a loophole to the game and the hunters can only attack him when he’s alone. A problem for Tommy though, none of his friends and family believe the game is real.

Production
The film was produced by MRC Film. Johnson had first pitched the idea to Netflix in 2017. Johnson wrote the screenplay during the covid-19 pandemic. He initially thought of it as “Jacob’s Ladder but with some laughs in it”. The film was scored by Dan Romer.

Release
The film has its premiere at the SXSW Film Festival in Austin, Texas on March 11, 2023.

Reception
It was described as a “silly and frequently suprising why-we-need-people parable” by Peter Debruge in Variety.

References

External links

2020s English-language films
2020s American films 
2023 films
2023 comedy films
Upcoming directorial debut films